"Wall to Wall" is the sixth television play episode of the first season of the Australian anthology television series Australian Playhouse. "Wall to Wall" was written by Ann Kinloch and directed by Eric Taylor and originally aired on ABC on 23 May 1966 It starred Gwen Plumb and was shot in Sydney.

Plot
Elizabeth Fletcher reflects on her lonely life on her birthday. She remembers her one chance at romance, several years previously. She goes to a dance where a man pities her and takes her home, where he is "trapped" by her father.

Cast
 Heather Christie as Elizabeth Fletcher
 Don Crosby as Mr Fletcher
 David Yorston as the Young Man
 Lyndall Barbour as Mrs Fletcher
 Gwen Plumb as the next door neighbour Mrs Cooper

Background
The play had originally been written by Adelaide writer Ann Kinloch for a 1962 competition for Channel Nine drama. However it was not used, the studio making The Valley of Water instead.

Reception
The Sydney Morning Herald thought "the dialogue is so soften stilted and at times too obvious and the author's intentions towards characters or actions are frequently obscure so that after a while one waits for the end in the hope - this time unavailing - that something can be made out of it all."

The Age called it "a bad play... embarrassing as it bellowed and whimpered through a predictable pattern of trite tragedies." Another reviewer in the same paper called it "one of the poorest of the series. The script might have been written by a schoolboy."

The Sunday The Sydney Morning Herald said Gwen Plumg "gets out nod for the week's finest performance" for her work in the show.

''The Bulletin' called the play "the silliest of all" the episodes of the series.

See also
 List of television plays broadcast on Australian Broadcasting Corporation (1960s)

References

External links
 
 

1966 television plays
1966 Australian television episodes
1960s Australian television plays
Australian Playhouse (season 1) episodes